Donte Lamar Nicholson (born December 18, 1981, in Los Angeles, California) is a former American football safety who played for the Tampa Bay Buccaneers of the National Football League. He was drafted by the Buccaneers in the fifth round of the 2005 NFL Draft. He played college football at Oklahoma.

Professional career

Tampa Bay Buccaneers
He appeared in nine games for the Buccaneers in the 2005 season and made five tackles. He was re-signed on November 27, 2006. On September 1, 2007, the Bucs released him. On September 29, 2007, the Bucs re-signed him.

In the 2009 offseason, the Bucs released him.

External links
Tampa Bay Buccaneers bio

1981 births
Living people
Players of American football from Los Angeles
American football safeties
Oklahoma Sooners football players
Tampa Bay Buccaneers players
People from Diamond Bar, California